In enzymology, a diiodotyrosine transaminase is an enzyme that catalyzes the chemical reaction

3,5-diiodo-L-tyrosine + 2-oxoglutarate  4-hydroxy-3,5-diiodophenylpyruvate + L-glutamate

Thus, the two substrates of this enzyme are 3,5-diiodo-L-tyrosine and 2-oxoglutarate, whereas its two products are 4-hydroxy-3,5-diiodophenylpyruvate and L-glutamate.

This enzyme belongs to the family of transferases, specifically the transaminases, which transfer nitrogenous groups.  The systematic name of this enzyme class is 3,5-diiodo-L-tyrosine:2-oxoglutarate aminotransferase. Other names in common use include diiodotyrosine aminotransferase, halogenated tyrosine aminotransferase, and halogenated tyrosine transaminase.  It employs one cofactor, pyridoxal phosphate.

References 

 
 

EC 2.6.1
Pyridoxal phosphate enzymes
Enzymes of unknown structure